Goumbou is a small town and seat of the commune of Ouagadou in the Cercle of Nara in the Koulikoro Region of south-western Mali. The town is 28 km southwest of Nara, the administrative centre of the cercle on the Route Nationale 4 that connects Nara and the Malian capital, Bamako.

Sister city
  Vegas del Genil, Spain

References

Populated places in Koulikoro Region